Bishop Ranch Regional Preserve (BRRP), also known as Bishop Ranch Regional Open Space Preserve is a  regional park on a ridge top at the edge of San Ramon, California.  It is near a residential area, west of San Ramon Valley Road and south of Bollinger Canyon Road. Trails are steep and there are no facilities other than a trailhead. It is part of the East Bay Regional Park District (EBRPD).

Bishop Ranch preserve is primarily a place for observing nature. There are three trails for hiking  biking and horseback riding, but no facilities for picnicking or camping. The steep terrain makes the trails generally unsuitable for wheelchairs.

In August, 2015, EBRPD announced that it had acquired a  tract along the Calaveras Ridge that will be added to BRRP, connecting Bishop Ranch with Dublin Hills Regional Park.. EBRPD board member Beverly Lane said this is part of an EBRPD plan to create a continuous trail that will reach from  Sunol to Lafayette through six regional parks. It cost $2 million, and was previously owned by the Wiedemann family, which had raised cattle here since the 1860s. EBRPD must complete a land-use plan for  the Bishop Ranch open space, before it can open this new acquisition for public use.

Notes

References

External links
 Bishop Ranch Regional Preserve official web page
 Bishop Ranch Regional Open Space Preserve (Trail Hikes)

East Bay Regional Park District
Parks in Contra Costa County, California